Giant Center is a 10,500-seat multi-purpose arena in Hershey, Pennsylvania, a census-designated place in the Harrisburg metropolitan area.  It is home to the Hershey Bears ice hockey team, the longest-existing member of the American Hockey League since 1938. Giant Center replaced the Hersheypark Arena as the Bears' home venue in 2002.

Giant Center is owned by the Derry Township Industrial and Commercial Development Authority, as much of the money for its construction was provided by the Commonwealth of Pennsylvania. It is operated by Hershey Entertainment and Resorts Company, with the naming rights owned by the Giant-Carlisle grocery store chain based in Carlisle, Pennsylvania.

Giant Center has 7,700 seats in the Lower Level and 2,800 seats in the Upper Level. The arena also has 688 Club Seats and 40 Luxury Suites. Wheelchair and companion seating is available on all levels.

History

In addition to Bears games, Giant Center also hosts an annual concert series and attracts many well-known entertainers. The first performance at the arena was by Cher on October 15, 2002, during her Living Proof: The Farewell Tour, selling 9,406 tickets. The arena has since continued to host a wide variety of popular acts, including American Idol Live! and the Harlem Globetrotters. In 2003, Giant Center held the WWE's Unforgiven.

Giant Center also hosted the Road to Victory rally for Republican presidential candidate, John McCain, and his running mate, Sarah Palin, on October 28, 2008. President Donald Trump also held campaign rallies on November 4, 2016, and on December 10, 2019, with the 2016 rally setting an all-time attendance record for the venue of 12,500 inside the facility and thousands more watching on screens in the parking lot.

WWE Raw was held at Giant Center with a three-hour Thanksgiving themed episode on November 23, 2009, and returned for a three-hour 'Old School' themed episode on November 15, 2010. WWE has also held several other Raw and WWE Friday Night SmackDown episodes here as well.

The largest crowd in Giant Center history was 11,002, which occurred on June 14, 2010, as the Bears clinched the Calder Cup Championship against the Texas Stars in Game 6 of the Calder Cup finals.

Giant Center and the city of Hershey also hosted the 2011 AHL All-Star Game and Skills Competition on January 30–31, 2011.

In 2014, it was home to the Harrisburg Stampede of the Professional Indoor Football League.

In 2015, Elizabethtown College hosted the NCAA Division III Wrestling Championships at the Giant Center.

Before the 2015/2016 Hershey Bears Hockey season, Hershey Entertainment & Resorts made a $4.7 million upgrade to the production system, a new four-sided, center-hung HD scoreboard, a new LED standings board and a new LED fascia ribbon surrounding the bowl, manufactured by Daktronics. The new scoreboard's video screens measure 13.52 feet high and 23.92 feet wide. Project was funded with all private funds from HE&R.

On October 1, 2016, country megastar Carrie Underwood broke the record for most attended concert when she brought her Storyteller Tour: Stories in the Round to the arena. The 360-degree angle of the stage stretched across the arena floor, providing all viewers with a good show. She returned on June 13, 2019, during her Cry Pretty Tour 360.

On October 25, 2016, the arena hosted the Kellogg's Tour of Gymnastics Champions.

Photos of the arena

Concessions

In 2007, the Giant Center Food and Beverage Department finalized a deal with PepsiCo, with all food and drink stands in the building switched from Coca-Cola products to Pepsi products. The switch was made to equalize operations with the rest of the Hershey Entertainment Complex.

Giant Center's concessions include traditional fast food items such as Chicken tenders, hamburger, french fries, and hot dogs, as well as various Italian items. Additional concessions available include Common Coffeehouse treats such as flavored coffee and pastries. The Smokehouse offering Smoked Pork BBQ, Burrito Bowls, Chicken and Beef Brisket. Cross Check Cafe offers made-to-order Berks Deli Sandwiches, Soup, Salad and Daily Specials for Bears Hockey games. Most locations also offer children meals. Turkey Hill, a local company from nearby Lancaster County, provides its own brand of ice cream products. In 2014 Arooga's Wing Shack (Local Company) opened offering chicken tenders, regular and boneless wings with a variety of different sauces.

Nodding to their presence nearby, various Hershey's chocolate products are available at most of the concession stands.

Concerts 
The arena has hosted a number of musical acts, including Cher, Rush, Trans-Siberian Orchestra, Tim McGraw, ZZ Top, Rod Stewart, Lynyrd Skynyrd, TobyMac, Third Day, Green Day, New Found Glory, Newsboys, Michael W. Smith, Josh Groban, Kelly Clarkson, Elton John, Fall Out Boy, Michael Bublé, Hilary Duff, The Who, Taylor Swift, George Strait, Little Big Town, Brad Paisley, Keith Urban, Justin Moore, Van Halen, Brad Paisley, Delirious?, Eagles, Theory of a Deadman, Mötley Crüe, New Kids on the Block, Jason Aldean, Skillet, Goo Goo Dolls, Meat Loaf, Flo Rida, Korn, Royal Tailor, Tenth Avenue North, Miranda Lambert, Chris August, Carrie Underwood, Fifth Harmony,  Selena Gomez, For King & Country, Casting Crowns, Avenged Sevenfold, MKTO, Demi Lovato, Randy Houser, Gaither Vocal Band, Thomas Rhett, Florida Georgia Line, Wiz Khalifa, Alice Cooper, Lady A, Earth, Wind & Fire, Chicago, Charlie Puth, Slipknot, Phil Wickham, Five Finger Death Punch, Unspoken, Danny Gokey, Volbeat, Foreigner, Cheap Trick, Chris Stapleton, Amy Grant, Bethel Music, Social Club Misfits, Matthew West, Natalie Grant, Zach Williams, Tesla, Styx, Why Don't We, Dan + Shay, Ryan Stevenson, Jordan Feliz, Aaron Cole, We Are Messengers, Jon McLaughlin, 2Cellos, Alan Jackson, Kidz Bop, Disturbed, Pentatonix, Post Malone, Swae Lee, James Taylor, Ghost, JoJo Siwa, Toto, Journey, Rick Astley, and Greta Van Fleet.

References

External links

 Official website (archived, 7 June 2021)

 

Gymnastics venues in the United States
Indoor arenas in Pennsylvania
Indoor ice hockey venues in Pennsylvania
Hershey Bears
Hersheypark
Hershey Entertainment and Resorts Company
Sports venues completed in 2002
Tourist attractions in Dauphin County, Pennsylvania
Wrestling venues in Pennsylvania
Buildings and structures in Dauphin County, Pennsylvania
2002 establishments in Pennsylvania